George Panackal V.C. is the director of Divine Retreat Centre, Potta and  is widely renowned among Christians in India for his charitable work, pastoral services as a gospel teacher and interpreter from a catholic perspective. His preachings at Divine Retreat Centre are aired every day in Shalom TV India, Divine TV, and Goodness (TV channel)

References

External links 
 About Divine Online
 Divine TV
 Website
 Delhi Divine Center
 Potta.com

Indian Christians
People from Thrissur